Formotosena is a genus of cicadas from Southeast Asia erected by Kato in 1925 to accommodate the species Formotosena seebohmi which was previously placed in the genus Tosena. Members of Formotosena are found in Southeast Asia, including southern China, Hainan and Taiwan.

List of species
 Formotosena montivaga (Distant, 1889)
 Formotosena seebohmi (Distant, 1904)

References

Hemiptera of Asia
Taxa named by Masayo Kato
Polyneurini
Cicadidae genera